The 1951 Philadelphia Eagles season was their 19th in the league. The team failed to improve on their previous output of 6–6, winning only four games. The team failed to qualify for the playoffs for the second consecutive season.

Off Season 
The Eagle hired Bo McMillin who took on the challenge of returning the Philadelphia Eagles to their previous glory was hired on February 8, 1951. However, after just two games (both wins), McMillin underwent surgery for what was believed to be ulcer troubles. The verdict was far worse: stomach cancer, which ended his coaching career. Assistant coach Wayne Miller took over as head coach for the rest of the year. He would resign weeks before the 1952 season citing health as the reason for stepping down.

NFL Draft 
The 1951 NFL Draft was held on January 18–19, 1951. This draft would be for players coming out of college and because Baltimore Colts folded after the 1950 season. The NFL placed their players in the 1951 NFL draft. The draft was 30 rounds with eleven teams picking. There was a total of 362 players drafted. 27 former Colts players were drafted including Y. A. Tittle by San Francisco 49ers.

The Eagles would rotate getting the 5th, 6th and 7th picks through the rounds as a results of their 6–6 record in 1950, tying them with Pittsburgh and Detroit.

With the lottery bonus pick as the #1 pick of the draft, the New York Giants choose Kyle Rote a Halfback from Southern Methodist University The 2nd pick in the draft was made by the Chicago Bears. This was the Baltimore Colts 1st round pick that would have had, that was earlier traded to Chicago. With this pick they choose Bob Williams a Quarterback from the Notre Dame.

With their 1st pick as the 7th selection in the 1st round the Eagles choose, Ebert Van Buren, brother of Steve Van Buren, a Fullback/Halfback out of LSU.

Player selections 
The table shows the Eagles selections and what picks they had that were traded away and the team that ended up with that pick. It is possible the Eagles' pick ended up with this team via another team that the Eagles made a trade with.
Not shown are acquired picks that the Eagles traded away.

Regular season

Schedule

Game recaps

Week 2 vs SF 49ers

Week 9 vs Pitt Steelers

Week 12 vs Cleve Browns 
The Eagles lost for the 4th time to the former AAFC member. They were out played by the American Conference champions Cleveland Browns, as they could only manage a net passing yard total of 8 yards for the game on 9 completions. The Eagles forced the Browns to turn the ball over 4 times, and sacked Otto Graham in the end zone for a safety as the only bright points of the game for the Eagles.

Standings

Playoffs 
The Philadelphia eagles finished with a 4–8–0 record and failed to make it to the 1951 NFL Championship Game. The game was played between the Cleveland Browns and Los Angeles Rams in Los Angeles on December 23, 1951, with an attendance of 59,475.

Roster 
(All time List of Philadelphia Eagles players in franchise history)

 Bo McMillin resigned after 2nd game because of stomach cancer
 Bud Grant is also in Canadian Football Hall of Fame

Postseason 
 Wayne Millner resigns before 1952 season after training camp

References 

Philadelphia Eagles seasons
Philadelphia Eagles
Philadelphia